The Aigio General Hospital, also known as General Hospital of Eastern Achaia - Unit of Aigio is a public general hospital situated a few kilometres out of the town of Aigio in the Peloponnese peninsula of southern Greece. It has a capacity of 100 beds. The hospital performs the greatest number of laparoscopic surgeries in Greece, while more than 50,000 people are examined on a yearly basis. The total personnel of the hospital numbered 217 in 2013.  It supports the operation of two sectors. The internal medicine sector (capacity 50 beds) has three departments: Internal Medicine (known as "pathology" in Greek medical practice), Cardiology and Paediatrics. The surgical sector (capacity 50 beds) has 6 departments: Surgical, Obstetrics and Gynaecology, Orthopaedic, Urological, Dental and Anaesthesiology. In 2007 the operating rooms of the surgery department were destroyed by fire and were totally rebuilt in 2008.

Gallery

References

External links 
Official website of the General Hospital of Aigio 

1958 establishments in Greece
Hospitals established in 1958
Hospitals in Greece
Aigio
Buildings and structures in Achaea